Yevgeni Viktorovich Chumachenko (born 18 December 1975) is a Russian professional football official and a former player. He is the director with  FC Energiya Volzhsky.

Club career
He made his debut in the Russian Premier League in 1995 for FC Rotor Volgograd.

References

1975 births
People from Volzhsky, Volgograd Oblast
Living people
Russian footballers
Association football defenders
Russia youth international footballers
FC Energiya Volzhsky players
FC Rotor Volgograd players
FC Lada-Tolyatti players
Russian Premier League players
FC Metallurg Lipetsk players
FC Novokuznetsk players
Sportspeople from Volgograd Oblast